Scalp reduction is a surgical procedure in which the hairless region of the scalp of a bald man is reduced. This procedure can reduce the area of the scalp in which hair transplantation is needed, or even eliminate the need for hair transplantation.

History 
Scalp reduction became very popular in the 1960s through the 1980s and was one of the best treatments for baldness. It is not commonly performed today, however about 5,000 men a year will receive hair transplantation  instead of a full scalp reduction surgery,. Scalp reduction may reduce the size of bald spots and treat baldness. The surgery usually takes about 2–3 hours with around 250 hair grafts and in cases of severe baldness, surgery may involve around 1,000 hair grafts.

Candidates for surgery 
 hair loss due to genetics
 healthy scalp
 scalp elasticity
 donor hairs ( healthy hairs on the side and back of scalp)
 must have permanent hair loss

After care 
 do not use cheap shampoo or conditioner
 do not comb or brush scalp
 listen to doctors instructions
 keep scalp moisturized
 stay out of sun because of the UV rays
 do not pull skin
 try not to stress because it can be harmful to the growth of your hair

Risk
 swelling
 bleeding around skin flaps that were stretched
 numbness and throbbing
 rare case of infection
 temporary hair loss
 lack of blood flow and oxygen to the scalp tissue
 scalp thinning
 rare case of scarring
 grafted area may not look as expected

Associated cost 
Pricing varies on how severe your baldness is, it costs well over 2,000 dollars for a straight forward scalp reduction procedure  4,000 dollars for a mild case but scalp reduction can cost up to 20,000 dollars for a severe case of hair loss that can be treated.

Health insurance 
Health insurance will not pay for any type of hair loss surgery for cosmetic reasons, but they may elect to pay if the hair loss is caused by Alopecia areata, accidents, or burns. Many offices offer payment plans to cover the surgery.

Surgeons 
Scalp reduction surgery is performed by a physician trained in plastic surgery and cosmetic surgery or dermatology. The surgery is performed in a hospital, outpatient office setting.

Alternatives 
 wig
 oral medication
 lotion that contains prescription

Lotions that contain Rogaine or finasteride may lead to hair growth in some patients. Rogaine grows fuzz on the crown of the head and finasteride tends to grow actual hairs on the crown of the head. Some recommend the use of lotions treatment to treat baldness before considering scalp reduction surgery.

Non-surgical hair restoration 
Low level laser therapy is a form of non surgical hair restoration, this hair growth therapy uses laser light to stimulate follicles on the scalp this process not only makes hair grow but it also thickens the hair which will increase the appearance of the hair.

Hair loss 
Haird loss is divided into the following:

Non scarring 
 Alopecia areata
 Psoriasis

Scarring hair loss 
 Lupus erthythematous
 Lichen planopilaris
 Bacterial or fungal infection
 Scleroderma

Genetic causes 
 male pattern hair loss
 female pattern hair loss
 20% of alopecia areata cases are thought to be transferred by genetics

References 

Plastic surgical procedures
Scalp